The Americas Zone was one of the three regional zones of the 1984 Davis Cup.

9 teams entered the Americas Zone in total, with the winner promoted to the following year's World Group. Chile defeated Brazil in the final and qualified for the 1985 World Group.

Participating nations

Draw

First round

Venezuela vs. Mexico

Quarterfinals

Chile vs. Colombia

Mexico vs. Canada

Caribbean/West Indies vs. Uruguay

Brazil vs. Peru

Semifinals

Chile vs. Mexico

Brazil vs. Uruguay

Final

Chile vs. Brazil

References

External links
Davis Cup official website

Davis Cup Americas Zone
Americas